Eugenio Monti (23 January 1928 – 1 December 2003) was an Italian bobsledder and alpine skier. He is one of the most successful athletes in the history of the bobsleigh, with ten World championship medals (of which nine gold) and 6 Olympic medals including two golds. He is known also for his acts of sportsmanship during the 1964 Winter Olympics in Innsbruck, Austria, which made him the first athlete ever to receive the Pierre de Coubertin medal.

Biography
Born in Toblach, Italy, The Flying Redhead was the best Italian young skier: he won the national titles in slalom and giant slalom, and finished third in downhill, but a 1951 accident stopped his alpine skiing career when he tore ligaments in both of his knees. Monti switched to bobsleigh, finding great success as a result. In 1954 he won his first Italian championship and in 1957 won his first world championship.

At the 1956 Winter Olympics in Cortina d'Ampezzo, he won silver medals in the 2-man and 4-man bobsled events. He could not compete in the 1960 Winter Olympics in Squaw Valley, California, because the bobsled race was not held for economic reasons (for the only time in the history of the Winter Olympic Games).

But it was during the 1964 Winter Olympics in Innsbruck that Monti performed the best-known act of his sporting career. Realizing that British bobsledders Tony Nash and Robin Dixon had broken a bolt on their sled, Monti lent them the bolt off his sled. The Britons won the gold medal in the 2-man bobsled, while Monti and his teammate took the bronze medal. Answering critics from the home press, Monti told them "Nash didn't win because I gave him the bolt. He won because he had the fastest run." Monti also showed his act of selfless generosity in the four-man competition. There, the Canadian team of Vic Emery had damaged their sled's axle and would have been disqualified had not Monti and his mechanics come to the rescue. The sled was repaired and the Canadian team went on to win the gold medal, while Monti's team took bronze.  For these acts of sportsmanship, he was awarded the Pierre de Coubertin medal.

Finally, at the 1968 Winter Olympics in Grenoble, France, a 40-year-old Monti won a gold in both the two-man and four-man events (the first non-German to do so). After his victory, he received Italy's highest civilian honor – the Commendatore of the Italian Republic and then retired to labor in his skiing facilities in Cortina.

Struck by numerous hardships (separation from his wife, the departure of his daughter for the United States, the death of his son from an overdose), suffering from Parkinson's disease, on 30 November 2003 he shot himself in the head; transported to the hospital in Belluno, he died the next day.

Turn 19 at Cesana Pariol, the site of the 2006 Winter Olympic bobsled, luge, and skeleton competitions, was named for Monti. The bobsleigh track that Monti competed on for years in Cortina and is slated for the 2026 Winter Olympics was renamed in his honor following his 2003 death.

Achievements

Bobsleigh

Olympic Games
 Gold medal in the two-man at the 1968 Winter Olympics
 Gold medal in the four-man at the 1968 Winter Olympics
 Silver medal in the two-man at the 1956 Winter Olympics
 Silver medal in the four-man at the 1956 Winter Olympics
 Bronze medal in the two-man at the 1964 Winter Olympics
 Bronze medal in the four-man at the 1964 Winter Olympics

World Championships
 Gold medal in the two-man in  1957, 1958, 1959, 1960, 1961, 1963, 1966
 Gold medal in the four-man in 1960, 1961
 Silver medal in the four man in 1957

Alpine skiing

National titles
Monti has won three national titles.

Italian Alpine Ski Championships
Slalom: 1949, 1950 (2)
Giant slalom: 1950 (1)

See also
 Legends of Italian sport - Walk of Fame
 Italy at the Olympics - Men gold medalist

References

External links
 
 

1928 births
2003 suicides
People from Toblach
Bobsledders at the 1956 Winter Olympics
Bobsledders at the 1964 Winter Olympics
Bobsledders at the 1968 Winter Olympics
Italian male alpine skiers
Italian male bobsledders
Olympic bobsledders of Italy
Olympic gold medalists for Italy
Olympic silver medalists for Italy
Olympic bronze medalists for Italy
People with Parkinson's disease
Recipients of the Pierre de Coubertin medal
Suicides by firearm in Italy
Olympic medalists in bobsleigh
Medalists at the 1956 Winter Olympics
Medalists at the 1964 Winter Olympics
Medalists at the 1968 Winter Olympics
2003 deaths
Sportspeople from Südtirol